Eduard "Edi" Frühwirth (17 November 1908 – 27 February 1973) was an Austrian football player and manager.

External links
Profile
Profile

1908 births
1973 deaths
Footballers from Vienna
Austrian footballers
SK Rapid Wien players
Austrian football managers
Floridsdorfer AC managers
Austria national football team managers
FC Schalke 04 managers
Karlsruher SC managers
FK Austria Wien managers
FC Viktoria Köln managers
Association football forwards
Floridsdorfer AC players
FC Admira Wacker Mödling managers
Burials at Ottakring Cemetery
Austrian expatriate football managers
Expatriate football managers in West Germany
Austrian expatriate sportspeople in West Germany
WSG Tirol managers